François Devosge, François III Devosge or Claude François III (25 January 1732, Gray, Haute-Saône - 22 December 1811, Dijon) was a French portraitist and history painter. Among his students were François Rude, Pierre-Paul Prud'hon and Claude Hoin. He is best known for his work as the founder of the École de Dessin de Dijon. His son Anatole Devosge (1770–1850) was also a painter, whilst his father Claude François Devosge (1697–1777) was a sculptor and architect.

1732 births
1811 deaths
People from Gray, Haute-Saône
18th-century French painters
French male painters
19th-century French painters
19th-century French male artists
18th-century French male artists